Priscila Domingues Cobello (born 19 May 1992) is a Brazilian female artistic gymnast and part of the national team.  She participated at the 2010 World Artistic Gymnastics Championships in Rotterdam, the Netherlands.

References

1992 births
Living people
Brazilian female artistic gymnasts
Place of birth missing (living people)
Gymnasts at the 2011 Pan American Games
South American Games gold medalists for Brazil
South American Games bronze medalists for Brazil
South American Games medalists in gymnastics
Competitors at the 2010 South American Games
Pan American Games competitors for Brazil
20th-century Brazilian women
21st-century Brazilian women